Dakshina Kannada Bus Operators' Association, also known as DKBOA is a bus operator association in Mangalore city and the Dakshina Kannada district.

References

Transport in Karnataka
Bus companies of India
Transport in Mangalore
Organisations based in Mangalore
Economy of Mangalore
Year of establishment missing